"You Were on My Mind" is a popular song written by Sylvia Fricker in 1961. It was originally recorded by Ian & Sylvia, but better known versions were recorded by We Five and Crispian St. Peters.

Background
The song was written in a bathtub in a suite at the Hotel Earle in Greenwich Village. Fricker wrote the song - her first composition - in the bathroom because "it was the only place ... the cockroaches would not go". 

It was originally performed by Fricker and her future husband Ian Tyson as the duo Ian & Sylvia, and they recorded it in 1963 for their 1964 album on the Vanguard label, Northern Journey. It reached #33 on the Canadian CHUM Charts. Ian and Sylvia re-recorded the song in 1972 with their band Great Speckled Bird, reaching No. 4 on the Canadian easy listening chart.

The song was published in sheet form by M. Witmark & Sons of New York City in 1965.

Charting cover versions
In 1965, the song was covered in an up-tempo version, with slightly altered lyrics and melody, by the California pop quintet We Five. Their recording reached No. 3 on the Billboard Hot 100 chart in September 1965 and topped the Billboard easy listening chart for five weeks. Billboard ranked the record as the No. 4 song of 1965. In Canada, this version reached No. 4. The performance by We Five is noteworthy for the gradual buildup in intensity, starting off somewhat flowing and gentle, increasing in intensity in the third stanza and remaining so through the fourth stanza. The fifth and final stanza starts off gently and concludes very intensely, ending with a series of guitar chords.
In the United Kingdom, Crispian St. Peters recorded the song in late 1965, and scored a No. 2 hit with it in 1966. His version was also released in the United States in 1967 and went to No. 36 on the Billboard Hot 100 and No. 29 in Canada. It was featured on his album, Follow Me...

See also
List of number-one adult contemporary singles of 1965 (U.S.)

References

External links
Los Angeles Times book review of Wounds to Bind, by We Five co-founder Jerry Burgan, which details the recording of "You Were on My Mind"

1961 songs
1965 debut singles
Sylvia Tyson songs
We Five songs
Barry McGuire songs
Crispian St. Peters songs
Jay and the Americans songs
Paul Anka songs
Nanci Griffith songs
Susanna Hoffs songs
A&M Records singles